Piscataway Technical High School (also known as MCVTS at Piscataway, Piscataway Tech and Piscataway Campus) is a four-year career academy and college preparatory magnet public high school located in Piscataway in Middlesex County, New Jersey, United States, that serves students in ninth through twelfth grades of many diverse cultures from all over Middlesex County as part of the Middlesex County Vocational and Technical Schools.

As of the 2021–22 school year, the school had an enrollment of 649 students and 57.0 classroom teachers (on an FTE basis), for a student–teacher ratio of 11.4:1. There were 262 students (40.4% of enrollment) eligible for free lunch and 55 (8.5% of students) eligible for reduced-cost lunch.

Athletics
The Piscataway Tech Raiders compete in the Greater Middlesex Conference, which is comprised of public and private schools in and around Middlesex County and operates under the supervision of the New Jersey State Interscholastic Athletic Association (NJSIAA). With 486 students in grades 10-12, the school was classified by the NJSIAA for the 2019–20 school year as Group II for most athletic competition purposes, which included schools with an enrollment of 486 to 758 students in that grade range.

School colors are hunter green and gold. Interscholastic sports offered by the school are baseball (men), basketball (men and women), soccer (men) and softball (women).

Administration
The school's principal is Nicole Slade. Her core administration team includes the two assistant principals.

References

External links
School website
Middlesex County Vocational and Technical Schools

National Center for Educational Statistics data for the Middlesex County Vocational and Technical Schools

Magnet schools in New Jersey
Piscataway, New Jersey
Public high schools in Middlesex County, New Jersey